Conception Bay South is a provincial electoral district for the House of Assembly of Newfoundland and Labrador, Canada. As of 2011 there are 9,938 eligible voters living within the district.

Composed of part of the town of Conception Bay South. A mix of rural and suburban populations, especially as the town of Conception Bay South grows. The district includes the communities of Foxtrap, Long Pond, Manuels, Kelligrews and part of Chamberlains. It is part of the St. John's metropolitan area.

The riding was created for the 1975 election from Harbour Main and St. John's North.

Members of the House of Assembly
The district has elected the following Members of the House of Assembly:

Election results

References

External links
Website of the Newfoundland and Labrador House of Assembly

Newfoundland and Labrador provincial electoral districts
Conception Bay South
1975 establishments in Newfoundland and Labrador